Chlamydiamicrovirus is a genus of viruses, in the family Microviridae, in the subfamily Gokushovirinae. Various species of chlamidia serve as natural hosts. There are four species in this genus.

Taxonomy
The following species are assigned to the genus:

 Chlamydia virus Chp1
 Chlamydia virus Chp2
 Chlamydia virus CPAR39
 Chlamydia virus CPG1

Structure
Viruses in Chlamydiamicrovirus are non-enveloped, with icosahedral and round geometries, and T=1 symmetry. The diameter is around 30 nm. Genomes are circular, around 6.1kb in length.

Life cycle
Viral replication is cytoplasmic. Entry into the host cell is achieved by pilus-mediated adsorption into the host cell. Replication follows the ssDNA rolling circle model. DNA-templated transcription is the method of transcription. The virus exits the host cell by bacteria lysis.
Various species of chlamidia serve as the natural host. Transmission routes are passive diffusion.

References

External links
 Viralzone: Chlamydiamicrovirus
 ICTV

Virus genera
Gokushovirinae